The 2005 Amsterdam Admirals season was the 11th season for the franchise in the NFL Europe League (NFLEL). The team was led by head coach Bart Andrus in his fifth year, and played its home games at Amsterdam ArenA in Amsterdam, Netherlands. They finished the regular season in second place with a record of six wins and four losses. In World Bowl XIII, Amsterdam defeated the Berlin Thunder 27–21. The victory marked the franchise's first World Bowl championship.

Offseason

Free agent draft

Personnel

Staff

Roster

Schedule

Standings

Game summaries

Week 1: vs Rhein Fire

Week 2: at Frankfurt Galaxy

Week 3: vs Berlin Thunder

Week 4: at Cologne Centurions

Week 5: at Berlin Thunder

Week 6: vs Frankfurt Galaxy

Week 7: at Hamburg Sea Devils

Week 8: vs Cologne Centurions

Week 9: vs Hamburg Sea Devils

Week 10: at Rhein Fire

World Bowl XIII

Notes

References

Amsterdam
Amsterdam Admirals seasons